Furia Alacranera (Eng.: Scorpion's Rage) is the title of the first studio album released by music group Alacranes Musical.

Track listing
The track listing from Allmusic.

CD

2003 albums
Alacranes Musical albums
Spanish-language albums